Reedville is an unincorporated community in Washington County, Oregon, United States, located between Hillsboro and Aloha. Oregon Route 8 (also known as the Tualatin Valley Highway) runs through the area. The community is served by the Hillsboro School District, with some portions of the area within the city limits of Hillsboro.

History
Reedville was named for Simeon Gannett Reed, who was a member of the Oregon Steam Navigation Company, and a prominent figure in Columbia River transportation in 1859-1879. Reed and business partner William S. Ladd operated an  plus hobby farm in the area where they raised livestock and held harness races. His property became the endowment of Reed College after the death of his wife Amanda Reed. Reedville post office was established in 1877 and ran until 1954.

In 2003, Hillsboro opened the Reedville Creek Park, which included the city’s first skate park. By 2004, parts of the community had been annexed into Hillsboro, which led to readdressing of several streets from the county based street numbering to the Hillsboro-based numbering system.

In 2016, ground broke on a new subdivision called Reed's Crossing in South Hillsboro. It is located just south of the intersection of Oregon Route 8 and Cornelius Pass Road. A commercial center called Reed's Crossing Town Center and a 23 acre Reed's Crossing Greenway park are expected to be in the new subdivision.

Sites of interest
Harvey the Rabbit on Tualatin Valley Highway. This roadside attraction was named for the rabbit in the film Harvey.
Reedville Creek Park on Cornelius Pass Road that includes Hillsboro's only skatepark as well as basketball courts, play equipment, and paths.

References

External links

Historic photos of Reedville from Salem Public Library

Neighborhoods in Oregon
Hillsboro, Oregon
Unincorporated communities in Washington County, Oregon
1877 establishments in Oregon
Populated places established in 1877
Unincorporated communities in Oregon